The North Lancashire and Cumbria League is an independent club cricket league for teams in Northern Lancashire and Cumbria.

Other club cricket leagues in the North West of England include the Northern Premier Cricket League and the designated ECB Premier League Liverpool and District Cricket Competition as well as the independent Lancashire League and Central Lancashire League.

History

In 1892 when the strongest local teams formed the North Lancashire League, while in the same year The Furness and District Cricket was also created.

For the 2015 season, the league structure has changed, meaning there is now a four tier league structure rather than the previous 3 tier, and Division 3 has changed to 40 overs-a-side compared to 50 overs in the other leagues.

For the 2018 season, the league structure changed again, with Division 3 being abolished while the top divisions expanded to include up to 12 teams. Whitehaven 2nd's were the last winners of Division 3. Division 2 is now 40 overs-a-side. The league changed name to the Cumbria Cricket League from the North Lancashire and Cumbria League.

Participating teams

Carlisle 
Cleator 
Cockermouth 
Dalton
Egremont 
Furness 
Haverigg 
Hawcoat Park
Keswick 
Kirkby in Furness
Lindal Moor
Millom 
Seascale 
Ulverston 
Vickerstown 
Whitehaven
Wigton
Windscale 
Workington

Past winners
2000 Barrow
2001 Cleator
2002 Barrow
2003 Millom
2004 Furness
2005 Millom
2006 Cockermouth
2007 Workington
2008 Workington
2009 Furness
2010 Furness
2011 Furness
2012 Cockermouth
2013 Furness
2014 Furness
2015 Furness
2016 Workington
2017 Workington

Cricket in Cumbria
English domestic cricket competitions